Eleutherodactylus griphus is a species of frog in the family Eleutherodactylidae endemic to Jamaica. Its natural habitat is subtropical or tropical moist lowland forest.
It is threatened by habitat loss.

References

griphus
Endemic fauna of Jamaica
Amphibians of Jamaica
Amphibians described in 1986
Taxonomy articles created by Polbot